The Wells–Guthrie House in Portland, Oregon was built in 1912.  It was listed on the National Register of Historic Places in 1990.

References

Houses on the National Register of Historic Places in Portland, Oregon
Houses completed in 1912
1912 establishments in Oregon
Mount Tabor, Portland, Oregon
Portland Historic Landmarks